Murray Clifton Watkins (October 16, 1915 – March 26, 1987), nicknamed "Skeeter", was an American Negro league third baseman in the 1940s.

A native of Towson, Maryland, Watkins was selected to play in the East–West All-Star Game in 1945 and 1946. Small of stature but fleet of foot, he often batted leadoff. Watkins died in Bolton Hill, Maryland, in 1987 at the age of 71.

References

External links
 and Seamheads

1915 births
1987 deaths
Newark Eagles players
Philadelphia Stars players
Baseball third basemen
Baseball players from Maryland
People from Towson, Maryland
20th-century African-American sportspeople